Arthur Augustus William Harry Ponsonby, 1st Baron Ponsonby of Shulbrede (16 February 1871 – 23 March 1946), was a British politician, writer, and social activist.  He was the son of Sir Henry Ponsonby, Private Secretary to Queen Victoria, and Mary Elizabeth Bulteel, daughter of John Crocker Bulteel. He was also the great-grandson of The 3rd Earl of Bessborough, The 3rd Earl of Bathurst and The 2nd Earl Grey. The 1st Baron Sysonby was his elder brother.

Ponsonby is often quoted as the author of the dictum "When war is declared, truth is the first casualty", published in his book Falsehood in War-time, Containing an Assortment of Lies Circulated Throughout the Nations During the Great War (1928). However, he uses this phrase in quotation marks as an epigram at the start of the book and does not present it as his own words.  Its likely origin is the almost identical line spoken in 1917 by the United States Senator Hiram Johnson: "The first casualty when war comes is truth".

Education and early career
Ponsonby was a Page of Honour to Queen Victoria from 1882 to 1887. From an Anglo-Irish family, he was educated at Eton College. While at Eton, Ponsonby was whipped for organising a steeplechase in his dormitory.

Ponsonby studied at Balliol College, Oxford, before joining the Diplomatic Service and taking assignments in Constantinople and Copenhagen.

Politics
At the 1906 general election, Ponsonby stood unsuccessfully as Liberal candidate for Taunton. He was elected as Member of Parliament for Stirling Burghs at a by-election of 1908, succeeding former Prime Minister Henry Campbell-Bannerman, who had died a few weeks earlier.

In Parliament, Ponsonby opposed the British involvement in the First World War and, with George Cadbury, Ramsay MacDonald, E. D. Morel, Arnold Rowntree, and Charles Trevelyan, he was a member of the Union of Democratic Control, which became a prominent antiwar organisation in Britain.

Ponsonby was defeated at the 1918 general election in which he stood as an "Independent Democrat" in the new Dunfermline Burghs constituency. He then joined the Labour Party and returned to the House of Commons at the 1922 general election as member for the Brightside division of Sheffield.

In 1924, Ramsay MacDonald appointed Ponsonby as Parliamentary Under-Secretary of State for Foreign Affairs, and he later served as Under-Secretary of State for Dominion Affairs and then as Parliamentary Secretary to the Ministry of Transport in 1929.

In 1930, Ponsonby was raised to the peerage as a hereditary baron, taking the title Lord Ponsonby of Shulbrede from his home at Shulbrede Priory in Sussex. He served as leader of the Labour Party in the House of Lords from 1931 until 1935, resigning because he was opposed to the party's support for sanctions against Italy for its invasion of Abyssinia.

In 1927–1928, Ponsonby ran a significant Peace Letter campaign against British preparations for a new war, and from 1936 he was an active member of the Peace Pledge Union, contributing regularly to Peace News.

Ponsonby opposed the initiative of Lord Charnwood and Cosmo Gordon Lang, Archbishop of Canterbury, to ask his Majesty's Government to react against the genocidal Holodomor policies of the Soviet Government.

From 1935 to 1937, he was Chair of the International Council of the War Resisters' International.

Resignation
In May 1940, Ponsonby resigned from the Labour Party, opposing its decision to join the new coalition government of Winston Churchill.

He wrote a biography of his father which won the James Tait Black Memorial Prize in 1942: Henry Ponsonby, Queen Victoria's Private Secretary: His Life and Letters.

Death
Ponsonby died on 23 March 1946 and was succeeded by his son Matthew Henry Hubert Ponsonby.

Personal life and family
On 12 April 1893, he married Dorothea Parry, daughter of Hubert Parry and Elizabeth Maude Herbert (1851–1933), a daughter of Sidney Herbert, 1st Baron Herbert of Lea. They had a daughter, Elizabeth (1900–1940), who during the 1920s became well known as a leading figure of the Bright Young People, and a son, Matthew (1904–1976), who became the 2nd Baron.

Arms

Works
 Rebels and Reformers: Biographies for Young People, with Dorothea Ponsonby. New York: H. Holt and Company (1919). .
 The Priory and Manor of Lynchmere and Shulbrede. Taunton: Barnicott and Pearce, and Wessex Press (1920). .
 A Conflict of Opinion, a Discussion on the Failure of the Church. London: Swarthmore Press (1919). .
 The Camel and the Needle's Eye (1910).
 The Decline of the Aristocracy (1912).
 "Democracy and Diplomacy" (1915)
 "Wars And Treaties" (1918)
 "A Conflict of Opinion: A Discussion on the Failure of the Church" (1922)
 "Now Is The Time: An Appeal For Peace" (1925)
"More English diaries; further reviews of diaries from the sixteenth to the nineteenth century with an introduction on diary reading", (1927)
 Falsehood in War-Time (1928).
 "Samuel Pepys" (1929)
 "Casual Observations" (1930)
 "John Evelyn, fellow of the Royal society: author of "Sylva" (1933)
 "Life Here And Now: conclusions derived From an examination of the sense of duration" (1936) 
 The Little Torch: Quotations From Diaries Of The Past For Every Day Of The Year" (1938)
 Henry Ponsonby: Queen Victoria's Private Secretary:His Life from his Letters (1942).

See also 
Ponsonby Rule

Notes

Bibliography 
 Jones, Raymond A. (1989). Arthur Ponsonby: The Politics of Life. Helm.
 Kidd, Charles, and David Williamson, eds (1990). Debrett's Peerage and Baronetage. New York: St. Martin's Press.

External links 

 
 Catalogue of the papers of Arthur Ponsonby at the Bodleian Library, Oxford
 Falsehood in War-Time: Propaganda Lies of the First World War by Arthur Ponsonby MP
 Two pictures of Ponsonby at The National Portrait Gallery (UK)
 Brief bio at Spartacus Schoolnet
  Google HTML of a PDF document.
 Arthur Ponsonby's Dream
 

Ponsonby, Arthur
Ponsonby, Arthur
Alumni of Balliol College, Oxford
Arthur Ponsonby, 1st Baron Ponsonby of Shulbrede
Barons in the Peerage of the United Kingdom
Ponsonby, Arthur
Labour Party (UK) MPs for English constituencies
Members of the Parliament of the United Kingdom for Stirling constituencies
Members of the Parliament of the United Kingdom for Fife constituencies
Ponsonby, Arthur
Ponsonby, Arthur
Ponsonby, Arthur
Ponsonby, Arthur
Ponsonby, Arthur
Ponsonby, Arthur
Ponsonby, Arthur
Ponsonby, Arthur
UK MPs who were granted peerages
Ponsonby, Arthur
James Tait Black Memorial Prize recipients
Labour Party (UK) hereditary peers
People from Windsor, Berkshire
Barons created by George V
Principal Private Secretaries to the Prime Minister
Chancellors of the Duchy of Lancaster
People educated at Eton College